Events from the year 1747 in Great Britain.

Incumbents
 Monarch – George II
 Prime Minister – Henry Pelham (Whig)
 Parliament – 9th (until 18 June), 10th (starting 13 August)

Events
 31 January –  the first venereal diseases clinic opens at London Lock Hospital.
 9 April – The Scottish Jacobite Simon Fraser, forfeited Lord Lovat, is beheaded by axe on Tower Hill in London for high treason, the last person to be executed in this way in Britain. Around twenty would-be spectators of the event are killed when a grandstand collapses.
 May – Abolition of Hereditable Jurisdictions Act breaks the power of the Scottish clans.
 14 May – War of the Austrian Succession: First Battle of Cape Finisterre: British fleet is victorious against the French.
 June
 Britain forms an alliance with Russia.
Indemnity Act of 1747 lifts further legal penalties from participants in the Jacobite rising of 1745.
 26 June – 4 August – Snap general election reinforces Henry Pelham's position as Prime Minister.
 2 July 
 War of the Austrian Succession: British forces led by the Duke of Cumberland defeated by Marshal Maurice de Saxe's French army at the Battle of Lauffeld near Maastricht in the Netherlands.
 Benjamin Robins presents a paper to the Royal Society describing the physics of a spinning projectile following his investigation of rifle barrels.
 October – Thomas Herring is appointed Archbishop of Canterbury.
 25 October – War of the Austrian Succession: Second Battle of Cape Finisterre: British fleet puts an end to French naval operations for the remainder of the war.
 17–19 November – Knowles Riot in Boston, Massachusetts, against impressment to the British Royal Navy.

Undated
 James Lind undertakes one of the first controlled experiments in clinical medicine, on the effect of citrus fruit as a cure for scurvy.
 Liverpool becomes the busiest slave trading port in Britain, overtaking Bristol.

Publications
 Hannah Glasse's cookbook The Art of Cookery, Made Plain and Easy.

Births
 birthdate unknown - Francis Salvador, Sephardic Jew born in London who became the first Jew elected to public office in British America, and the first Jew to die in the cause of American independence (died 1776) 
 15 January – John Aikin, doctor and writer (died 1822)
 18 January – John Gillies, historian and classical scholar (died 1836)
 26 January – Samuel Parr, schoolmaster (died 1825)
 6 July – John Paul Jones, sailor and the United States's first well-known naval fighter in the American Revolution (died 1792)
 12 December – Anna Seward, writer (died 1809)
 Benjamin Vulliamy, clockmaker (died 1811)

Deaths
 8 February – Thomas Chubb, Deist (born 1679)
 9 April – Simon Fraser, 11th Lord Lovat, Scottish clan chief (born c.1667)
 9 May – John Dalrymple, 2nd Earl of Stair, Scottish soldier and diplomat (born 1673)
 10 October – John Potter, Archbishop of Canterbury (born c.1674)
 2 December – Vincent Bourne, English classical scholar (born 1695)

References

 
Years in Great Britain